Sadd-e Ekbatan (also Romanized as Sadd-e Ekbātān; also known as Sadd-e Shahnāz) is a village in Alvandkuh-e Sharqi Rural District, in the Central District of Hamadan County, Hamadan Province, Iran. At the 2006 census, its population was 207, in 7 families. "Ekbatan" reflects the ancient name of Hamadan, "Ecbatana".

References 

Populated places in Hamadan County